Sunni vunda, or Sunnundalu is Andhra Pradesh's famous laddu. Minapappu or Urad (bean)Dal is first roasted dry until it turns golden brown and then is sieved. Ground sugar, cardamom seeds, ghee is added and mixed well and then with a handful of butter it is made to a round shape.

See also
 Ariselu
 Boorelu

References

Andhra cuisine
Indian cuisine